Rugulina is a genus of sea snails, marine gastropod molluscs in the family Pendromidae.

Distribution
These species has a bipolar distribution. They occur in the cold waters of the Western Atlantic and two species off Antarctica.

Species
Species within the genus Rugulina include:
 Rugulina antarctica (Numanami, 1996)
 Rugulina fragilis (Sars, 1878)
 Rugulina ignobilis (Thiele, 1912)
 Rugulina monterosatoi (van Aartsen & Bogi, 1986)
 Rugulina tenuis (Thiele, 1912)
 Rugulina verrilli (Tryon, 1888)

References

 Gofas, S.; Le Renard, J.; Bouchet, P. (2001). Mollusca, in: Costello, M.J. et al. (Ed.) (2001). European register of marine species: a check-list of the marine species in Europe and a bibliography of guides to their identification. Collection Patrimoines Naturels, 50: pp. 180–213
 Spencer, H.; Marshall. B. (2009). All Mollusca except Opisthobranchia. In: Gordon, D. (Ed.) (2009). New Zealand Inventory of Biodiversity. Volume One: Kingdom Animalia. 584 pp

Pendromidae